is a former Japanese football player and manager. He played for the Japanese national team.

Club career
Asano was born in Hokota on February 23, 1967. After graduating from high school, torough Toyota Shukyu-Dan, he joined Japan Soccer League club Toyota Motors (later Nagoya Grampus Eight) in 1987. In 1992, Japan Soccer League was folded and founded new league J1 League. In 1994, he moved to Urawa Reds on loan. In 1995, he returned and the club won 1995 and 1999 Emperor's Cup. Toward the end of his career, he played at FC Tokyo (2000) and Kawasaki Frontale (2001). He retired in 2001.

National team career
On June 2, 1991, Asano debuted for Japan national team against Thailand. He played 8 games and scored 1 goal for Japan until 1994.

Coaching career
After retirement, Asano started coaching career at Shonan Bellmare in 2007. He moved to Avispa Fukuoka in 2010 and he became a manager as Yoshiyuki Shinoda successor in August 2011. However the club was relegated to J2 League and he resigned end of the season. In 2013, he signed with L.League club Iga FC Kunoichi and managed until September 2014. In 2015, he signed with Japan Football League club Kagoshima United FC. In 2015 season, the club won 4th place and was promoted to J3 League. In 2017, he moved to J3 League club AC Nagano Parceiro. He resigned in June 2018.

Club statistics

National team statistics

Managerial statistics

References

External links
 
 Japan National Football Team Database
 
 

1967 births
Living people
Association football people from Ibaraki Prefecture
Japanese footballers
Japan international footballers
Japan Soccer League players
J1 League players
J2 League players
Nagoya Grampus players
Urawa Red Diamonds players
FC Tokyo players
Kawasaki Frontale players
Japanese football managers
J1 League managers
J3 League managers
Avispa Fukuoka managers
Kagoshima United FC managers
AC Nagano Parceiro managers
Association football midfielders
Footballers at the 1994 Asian Games
Asian Games competitors for Japan